The Return is a 1998 eurodance album by German techno act Pharao.

Track listing

1998 albums
Pharao albums